Kalidou Cissokho (born 28 August 1978 in Dakar) is a Senegalese former professional footballer who played as a goalkeeper.

International career
Cissokho was called up to Senegals 2002 FIFA World Cup squad by Bruno Metsu as a backup to Tony Sylva.

Career statistics

Honours
ASC Jeanne d'Arc
 Senegal Premier League: 1999, 2001, 2002, 2003
 Senegal Assemblée Nationale Cup: 2001

FK Baku
 Azerbaijan Premier League: 2005–06, 2008–09
 Azerbaijan Cup: 2004–05, 2009–10, 2011–12

References

External links
Fifa.com
Profile on FK Baku Official Site

1978 births
Living people
Footballers from Dakar
Senegalese footballers
Senegal international footballers
Association football goalkeepers
ASC Jeanne d'Arc players
FC Baku players
2002 FIFA World Cup players
2004 African Cup of Nations players
Senegalese expatriate footballers
Senegalese expatriate sportspeople in Azerbaijan
Expatriate footballers in Azerbaijan